Simone Gouws (born 28 February 1999) is a South African field hockey player for the South African national team.

She participated at the 2018 Women's Hockey World Cup.

References

External links

1999 births
Living people
South African female field hockey players
Female field hockey midfielders
Expatriate field hockey players
South African expatriates in Germany